The fifth European Athletics Team Championships took place on 21 and 22 June 2014.

Calendar

Super League 

Place: Eintracht-Stadion, Braunschweig, Germany

Participating countries

Men's events

Women's events

Score table

Final standings

First League 

Place: Kadriorg Stadium, Tallinn, Estonia

Participating countries

Men's events

Women's events

Score table

Final standings

Second League 

Place: Daugava Stadium, Riga, Latvia.

Participating countries

Men's events

Women's events

Score table

Final standings

Third League 
Place: – Dinamo Arena, Tbilisi, Georgia.

Participating countries

 Athletic Association of Small States of Europe()

Men's events

Women's events

Score table

Final standings

References
Super League results
First League results
Second League results
Third League results

European Athletics Team Championships
Team
European